Morgan & Lindsey was an American variety store chain. At its peak, it had 85 outlets in Texas, Arkansas, Louisiana, Alabama, and Mississippi. The company was headquartered in Jasper, Texas, and became a subsidiary of G. C. Murphy in 1959. The chain continued to operate Morgan & Lindsey stores until 1980, when most were re-branded to G. C. Murphy.

History
The first Morgan & Lindsey store opened in Oakdale, Louisiana in 1921. By 1923, the store had stores in DeRidder and Natchitoches, Louisiana, along with Lufkin and Jasper, Texas.

The Morgan and Lindsey store in Minden, Louisiana, was relocated in 1923 to make way for a new department store, West Brothers, founded by H.O. West and his brothers, natives of DeRidder, Louisiana. By 1955, West had 31 stores in the chain.

G. C. Murphy assumed ownership of the Morgan and Lindsey chain in 1959 and continued to operate the chain as a subsidiary. G. C. Murphy continued to operate the stores under the Morgan and Lindsey name until 1980, when most were converted to the G. C. Murphy brand.

References

External links
 G.C.Murphy Memories

Defunct discount stores of the United States
Five and dimes
Retail companies established in 1921
1921 establishments in Louisiana
1980 disestablishments in Louisiana